Tatvan District is a district of Bitlis Province of Turkey. Its seat is the city of Tatvan. Its area is 1,885 km2, and its population is 96,884 (2021).

Composition
There is one municipality in Tatvan District:
 Tatvan

There are 57 villages in Tatvan District:

 Adabağ
 Alacabük
 Anadere
 Benekli
 Bolalan
 Budaklı
 Çalıdüzü
 Çanakdüzü
 Çavuşlar
 Çekmece
 Çevreköy
 Dağdibi
 Dalda
 Dibekli
 Dönertaş
 Düzcealan
 Eğritaş
 Göllü
 Güntepe
 Güreşçi
 Hanelmalı
 Harmanlı
 Kağanlı
 Kaynarca
 Kırkbulak
 Kısıklı
 Kıyıdüzü
 Koruklu
 Koyluca
 Koyunpınarı
 Köprücek
 Kuruyaka
 Kuşluca
 Küçüksu 
 Nohutlu
 Obuz
 Odabaşı
 Oruçlu
 Örenlik
 Sallıca
 Sarıdal
 Sarıkum
 Söğütlü
 Suboyu
 Teknecik
 Tokaçlı
 Topraklı
 Tosunlu
 Ulusoy
 Uncular
 Uslu
 Yassıca
 Yediveren
 Yelkenli 
 Yoncabaşı
 Yumrukaya
 Yumurtatepe

References

Districts of Bitlis Province